Richard Vincent Van Patten (December 9, 1928 – June 23, 2015) was an American actor, comedian, businessman, and animal welfare advocate, whose career spanned seven decades of television. He was best known for his role as patriarch Tom Bradford on the ABC television comedy-drama Eight Is Enough.

Van Patten began work as a child actor and was successful on the New York stage, appearing in more than a dozen plays as a teenager. He worked in radio, on Duffy's Tavern. He later starred in numerous television roles including the long-running CBS television series, "Mama" and Young Doctor Malone. Later, he would star or co-star in many feature films, including Charly, Mel Brooks's Robin Hood: Men in Tights and Spaceballs, and Soylent Green. Van Patten was the founder of Natural Balance Pet Foods and National Guide Dog Month.

Early life
Richard Vincent Van Patten was born on December 9, 1928, in the Kew Gardens section of the New York City borough of Queens, the elder child of Richard Byron Van Patten, an interior decorator, and Josephine Rose (née Acerno), who worked in advertising. His younger sister is actress Joyce Van Patten.

His mother was of Italian descent, while his father had Dutch and English ancestry. He began work as a model and actor as a child making his Broadway debut at the age of seven. He was successful on the New York City stage, appearing in a dozen theatrical plays before reaching his teen years. He later moved to Hollywood and began a lengthy career in film and television.

Career

Actor
Van Patten's career in show business began as a child actor on Broadway in 1935 in Tapestry In Gray starring Melvyn Douglas. He was billed as "Dickie Van Patten" and went on to appear in twelve other Broadway plays as a teenager including The Skin of Our Teeth. He moved on to television with the role of Nels Hansen in the CBS series, Mama, starring Peggy Wood, about a Norwegian-American family living in San Francisco, in the early 20th century. It ran from 1949 to 1957. In 1949, James Dean, then an unknown, replaced Patten on the show for a time, when Patten was drafted into the Army. In 1975, he played "Friar Tuck" on When Things Were Rotten, a comic take on Robin Hood, created by Mel Brooks. The series ran for 13 episodes before being canceled. He was best known as the Bradford family patriarch, Tom Bradford, on Eight Is Enough, which aired from 1977 to 1981, and which was loosely based on a book of the same name by the American journalist Thomas Braden.

Van Patten appeared in episodes of Sanford and Son, Banacek, Arrested Development, The Brian Keith Show, Cannon, The Streets of San Francisco, Adam-12, Emergency!, Growing Pains, and Happy Days. He had numerous leading roles in motion pictures including Joe Kidd, The Snowball Express and The Santa Trap. He played a small role in the dystopian film Soylent Green (1973).

Van Patten appeared in several films directed by Mel Brooks, including High Anxiety, Spaceballs, and Robin Hood: Men in Tights, as well as cameos in the music videos for "Smells Like Nirvana" and "Bedrock Anthem" by "Weird Al" Yankovic, and on The Weird Al Show. He played "Jack Benson" in Opposite Day (2009). He also was a commentator for the World Series of Poker from 1993 to 1995.

The Hollywood Walk of Fame honored Van Patten on November 20, 1985, with a Star of Television marker at 1541 North Vine Street. On January 12, 2008, Van Patten received a star on the Palm Springs Walk of Stars.

On November 1, 2009, Phoenix Books published Eighty Is Not Enough!, a book co-authored by Van Patten and Robert Baer, in which Van Patten shared his 80-year journey of insights and anecdotes through the entertainment industry. He discusses his journey from his humble beginning in Queens, New York; his rise as a childhood star on Broadway during the Great Depression; working as an actor on the radio; the advent of television and his role in the second-ever live situation comedy Mama; a rough period between acting gigs including spending time as a real estate agent in Queens, NY; a rise back to the top that led the TV icon to the lead role on the popular hit show Eight Is Enough and subsequent roles in television and movies.

Other work

An animal enthusiast, Van Patten co-founded Dick Van Patten's Natural Balance Pet Foods in 1989. Van Patten's creation of his own brand of dog food was satirized in comedian John Hodgman's 2008 book More Information Than You Require, and was rebranded as Dick Van Patten's Hobo Chili for Dogs. He founded National Guide Dog Month which began in 2008 to raise awareness and money for non-profit guide dog schools in the United States, accredited by the International Guide Dog Federation. Van Patten also appeared as a television spokesman for Fisher-Price toys in the late 1980s.

Personal life

Family

Patriarch of a famous Hollywood family, Van Patten was the older brother of actress Joyce Van Patten, and the older half-brother of film director and Emmy award-winning television director/producer Tim Van Patten. He was married to Patricia Helon Poole (also known as Pat Poole and Pat Van Patten; born March 12, 1931) from 1954 until his death. Pat Poole was a professional dancer on Broadway and a June Taylor dancer on The Jackie Gleason Show. They lived in Sherman Oaks, California. They had three sons, all actors: Vincent, Nels, and Jimmy. Nels, who is married to actress Nancy Valen, is named for the character Van Patten played on the CBS's Mama. Van Patten was related to several other actors through marriages. His sister Joyce married actor Martin Balsam; their daughter is actress Talia Balsam. Talia's first husband was actor George Clooney, and she is now married to actor John Slattery. Van Patten's son, Vince, is married to actress Eileen Davidson.

Illness and death

In January 2006, Van Patten was taken to Cedars Sinai Medical Center in Los Angeles after suffering a diabetic stroke. Van Patten, who suffered from Type 2 diabetes, made a full recovery. Van Patten died at Saint John's Health Center in Santa Monica, California, on June 23, 2015, at age 86. Complications from diabetes were the listed cause.

Willie Aames, who played son Tommy Bradford on Eight Is Enough, called his television father "truly a gem [who] will be missed. ... As Dick always said, 'Remember our times together, gang ... Cause these ARE the good ole' days".  Betty Buckley, Van Patten's co-star on the series, recalled, "Every day on the set he was a happy, jovial person, always generous and ready to play, tease, and always keep us all laughing. He was the consummate professional, a wonderful actor, master of comedy, and a kind and generous human being."

He is interred in the Forest Lawn Memorial Park in the Hollywood Hills of Los Angeles.

Honors
On November 20, 1985, Dick Van Patten was honored with a star on the Hollywood Walk of Fame.  In 2008, a Golden Palm Star on the Palm Springs, California, Walk of Stars was dedicated to him.

Filmography

Film

Television

Bibliography

References

External links
 
 
 
 
 

1928 births
2015 deaths
20th-century American male actors
21st-century American male actors
American male child actors
American male film actors
American male stage actors
American male television actors
American people of Dutch descent
American people of English descent
American people of Italian descent
Burials at Forest Lawn Memorial Park (Hollywood Hills)
Businesspeople from Los Angeles
Deaths from diabetes
Disney people
Male actors from New York City
People from Kew Gardens, Queens
Poker commentators
Van Patten family